EL VY is an American indie rock duo that consists of Matt Berninger (lead vocalist of The National) and Brent Knopf (founding member of Ramona Falls and Menomena). The duo released their debut album, Return to the Moon, in October 2015.

History 
Berninger and Knopf met when The National and Menomena shared a bill in Portland, Oregon on October 24, 2003, at Holocene. The two became friends and kept in touch, periodically playing gigs together in subsequent years.

EL VY released its debut studio album, Return to the Moon, in October 2015, which Berninger, inspired by both Grease and We Jam Econo, imagined "as a sort of punk rock musical following the adventures of Didi and Michael—named after the Minutemen's D. Boon and Mike Watt." EL VY tours as a four-piece, with Matt Sheehy on bass guitar and Andy Stack on drums.

On January 11, 2016, following the death of David Bowie, EL VY performed a cover of Bowie's "Let's Dance" on The Late Show with Stephen Colbert, collaborating with Colbert's house band, Jon Batiste & Stay Human.

In October 2016, EL VY contributed a song and videogame to Dave Eggers' 30 Days, 50 Songs project, entitled "Are These My Jets".

Members 
Official Members
 Matt Berninger – lead vocals, lyrics
 Brent Knopf – music composition, production, keys, guitars, synths, programming
Touring Members
 Andy Stack (of Wye Oak) – drums
 Matt Sheehy (of Lost Lander) – bass guitar

Collaborators 
During the recording of Return to the Moon, EL VY collaborated with several artists, including drummers Drew Shoals (of Train) and John O'Reilly Jr (fun. and others), violinist Lauren Jacobson (The Lumineers and others), and background vocalists Ural Thomas, Moorea Masa, Allison Hall, and Margaret Wehr. A unique art card was created by John Solimine for each song on the album. Return to the Moon was mastered by Greg Calbi at Sterling Sound, mixed by Craig Silvey at Toast (assisted by Eduardo de la Paz). EL VY later enlisted Andrew Joslyn for strings on "Are These My Jets".

Discography

Studio albums

Singles

References

External links 

Under the Radar

Indie rock musical groups from Oregon
American musical duos
American supergroups